Florian Chabrolle (born 7 April 1998) is a French professional footballer of Martiniquais and Algerian descent, who plays as a striker for  club Ajaccio.

Club career
Chabrolle made his professional debut on 29 November 2018 in the UEFA Europa League group stage against Eintracht Frankfurt. He replaced Valère Germain after 64 minutes in a 4–0 away loss.

Career statistics

References

External links

Marseille profile

1998 births
Living people
French footballers
Association football forwards
France youth international footballers
Ligue 1 players
Ligue 2 players
Championnat National 2 players
Championnat National 3 players
Olympique de Marseille players
AC Ajaccio players
French people of Algerian descent